Dan Sickles is an American documentary film director, writer, actor and producer. He is best known for his documentaries, Mala Mala and Dina. In 2015, he was named in Out magazine's OUT100.

Life and career
Sickles was born in Fort Washington, Pennsylvania. He earned his BFA from New York University's Tisch School of the Arts in 2010.

Sickles directed, wrote and produced his debut documentary, Mala Mala, along with Antonio Santini, about nine trans-identifying individuals in Puerto Rico, which premiered at the Tribeca Film Festival and won the runner-up audience award at the 2014 Tribeca Film Festival. In 2015, he directed a short film, I Ate the Cosmos for Breakfast, based on the Melissa Studdard poetry collection I Ate the Cosmos for Breakfast.

In 2017, Sickles directed and produced his second documentary, Dina, along with Antonio Santini, about a love story between a suburban woman and a Walmart door greeter, premiered at the Sundance Film Festival.

Filmography

As actor
 2012 : Art Machine (Feature film)
 2013 : High Maintenance (TV Series)

Awards and nominations

References

External links
 
 

American documentary film directors
American documentary film producers
American male film actors
American male television actors
Living people
Year of birth missing (living people)